is a train station in Ebino, Japan. It is operated by JR Kyushu and is on the Kitto Line.

Lines

Layout 
The station consists of an island platform serving two tracks at grade. The station building is the original timber structure in traditional Japanese style from the time the station was opened in 1912 during the Taisho period. It has become unstaffed and now serves only as a waiting room. Access to the island platform is by means of a level crossing with ramps. Parking and a bike shed are available at the forecourt.

Adjacent stations

History
Ebino (at that time named ) was opened on the same day as one of several intermediate stations along the track. On 6 December 1932, the same stretch was separated out and was designated as the Kitto Line with Miyakonojō as the starting point. With the privatization of Japanese National Railways (JNR), the successor of JGR, on 1 April 1987, Kakutō came under the control of JR Kyushu. On 1 November 1990, Kakutō was renamed Ebino.

On 25 April 2014, the station building gained protected status as a Registered National Tangible Cultural Property.

Passenger statistics
In fiscal 2016, the station was used by an average of 79 passengers (boarding only) per day.

See also
List of railway stations in Japan

References

External links
Ebino (JR Kyushu)

Railway stations in Miyazaki Prefecture
Railway stations in Japan opened in 1912